Grafenwöhr Army Airfield  is a military airport near Grafenwöhr, a small town in Bavaria, Germany. It is located adjacent to the Grafenwöhr Training Area, for which it acts as an air assault zone.

References

Airports in Bavaria
United States Army posts